Arisaema decipiens is a species of Arisaema found in Guangxi, Guizhou, Hunan, Sichuan, Xizang, Yunnan provinces of China, India, Myanmar, and Vietnam growing in evergreen forest at elevations of 600–1600 meters.

Taxonomy
This plant is in monotypic in its own section Arisaema sect. Decipientia  distinguished by having branching underground cylindric rhizomes and around two pedate leaves.

References

External links

Flora of China
Flora of India (region)
Flora of Vietnam
decipiens